M. V. Venkatappa (1932–2013) was an Indian politician from the state of Karnataka. He was born in a Vokkaliga family. Venkatappa was the Karnataka Legislative Assembly speaker from 1999 to 2004, as MLA from Mulbagal.

His brother M. V. Krishnappa was involved in India's freedom movement and was also the founder of the Bangalore Dairy. He was a minister in Jawaharlal Nehru's cabinet and was elected to the Lok Sabha six times. He was also a Member of Legislative Council in Karnataka for a brief period. M. V. Venkatappa unsuccessfully contested Legislative Council Polls along with Lingayath leader N. R. Jagadeesh as Independent candidate to ensure votes from Veerappa Moily led Indian National Congress (Indira) and S. Bangarappa led Karnataka Kranti Ranga in 1983. Both leaders were defeated by Abdul Nazir Sab and P.G.R. Sindhia who later became ministers in Janata Party governments led by Ramakrishna Hegde and S. R. Bommai.

His son Rajeev Gowda, was also an Indian politician and academician. He is a former member of parliament in the Rajya Sabha from 26 June 2014 till 25 June 2020 and a national spokesperson for the Indian National Congress.

References 

Speakers of the Karnataka Legislative Assembly
2013 deaths
Karnataka MLAs 1999–2004
Indian National Congress politicians from Karnataka
1932 births